Imperial Reservoir is a reservoir in Pecos County, Texas, south of the Pecos River and four miles south of Grandfalls. It is bordered by Ranch to Market Road 2593 on the north and east; State Highway 18 is to the west. 

The reservoir covers approximately 1,530 surface acres and has a capacity of 8,500 acre-feet.  It is fed by Imperial Ditch (taking water from the Pecos River approximately 16 miles to the northwest), and discharges into the Imperial Canal. The reservoir was constructed around 1912 to provide irrigation water to the canal and to promote land sales. Since 1955 the reservoir has been operated for recreational use by the Imperial Volunteer Fire Department.

References

External links

Protected areas of Pecos County, Texas
Reservoirs in Texas
Bodies of water of Pecos County, Texas